Markussen is a surname. Notable people with the surname include:

Jørgen Markussen (born 1943), Danish footballer
Niels Markussen (1934–2008), Danish sailor
Nikolaj Markussen (born 1988), Danish handball player
Rudy Markussen (born 1977), Danish boxer
Toralv Kollin Markussen (1895–1973), Norwegian politician